Joseph-Omer Gour (born Joseph-Omer Gourd; November 12, 1893 – March 24, 1959) was an Ontario farmer, merchant and political figure. He represented Russell in the House of Commons of Canada as a Liberal member from 1945 to 1959.

He was born in St-Victor D'Alfred, Ontario in 1893, the son of Wilfrid Gour and Eliza Marleau, and was educated in Alfred and Plantagenet. He lived in Casselman. In 1929, he married Aurore Laurin. Gour served as mayor of Casselman from 1930 to 1935. His older brother, David Gourd also served in the House of Commons. He died in office in Ottawa in 1959.

References 
 Histoire des Comtes Unis de Prescott et de Russell, L. Brault (1963)

External links 

1893 births
1959 deaths
Liberal Party of Canada MPs
Members of the House of Commons of Canada from Ontario
Mayors of places in Ontario
Franco-Ontarian people